Bastardiopsis is a genus of trees in the family Malvaceae, containing the following species:
Bastardiopsis densiflora (Hook. & Arn.) Hassl.
Bastardiopsis eggersii (Baker f.) Fuertes & Fryxell
Bastardiopsis grewiifolia (Ulbr.) V.R.Fuertes & Fryxell
Bastardiopsis myrianthus (Planch. & Linden ex Triana & Planch.) Fuertes & Fryxell
Bastardiopsis turumiquirensis (Steyerm.) V.R.Fuertes & Fryxell
Bastardiopsis yaracuyensis (Fryxell) Dorr

References

Malveae
Malvaceae genera